The open-mid central rounded vowel, or low-mid central rounded vowel, is a vowel sound, used in some spoken languages. The symbol is called closed reversed epsilon. It was added to the IPA in 1993; before that, this vowel was transcribed .

Features

Occurrence

Notes

References

External links
 

Open-mid vowels
Central vowels
Rounded vowels